Yeduguri Sandinti Vijayalakshmi (born 19 April 1956), better known as Y. S. Vijayamma, is an Indian politician from the Rayalaseema region of  Andhra pradesh. She served as an MLA representing Pulivendla constituency. She was the chairperson of the YSR Congress Party from 2011 to 2022. Her husband, Y. S. Rajashekhara Reddy, popularly known as YSR, served as the 14th Chief Minister of Andhra Pradesh. Her son Y. S. Jaganmohan Reddy, is the 17th and current Chief Minister of Andhra Pradesh.

Early life
She was born to Pochamreddy Ramanjula Reddy and Tulasamma in the village of Chimalavagula Palli, Tadipatri Taluk. She married Reddy while he pursued his medical career. The couple has two children, Jaganmohan Reddy and Sharmila.

Family tree

Career

She was elected to the Andhra Pradesh Legislative Assembly as an unopposed Indian National Congress candidate in the by-election held to Pulivendula constituency in December 2009 to fill the vacancy caused by her husband's death. She lost the LS election for Visakhapatnam seat in 2014.

The humiliation meted out to the YSR family by the Congress high command provoked the family member Y. S. Vivekananda Reddy, against Y. S. Jagan Mohan Reddy to threaten him politically. Vijayamma quit the Congress party and assembly membership along with her son who also quit both the party and his MP seat on 29 Nov 2010.

Vijayamma and her son Y. S. Jagan Mohan Reddy were again elected to the assembly and Lok Sabha respectively in the by-elections held on 8 May 2011. Both of them fought the by-elections on behalf of the fledgling YSR Congress Party founded by her son on 12 March 2011.

In the by-polls to the Kadapa Lok Sabha and Pulivendula assembly seats, Jagan Mohan Reddy and Vijayamma retained the seats respectively, but as YSRCP candidates with record majorities. Jagan Mohan Reddy won the Kadapa seat with an all-time record majority of 543,053 votes, while Vijayamma won the Pulivendula seat with a record margin of 85,191 votes.

Later, by undertaking the poll campaign along with her daughter Y. S. Sharmila Reddy, Vijayamma  guided the YSR Congress Party to an unprecedented victory in the June 2012 by-polls in which their party won 15 of the 18 assembly seats  for which the polls were held in the absence of her son Y. S. Jagan Mohan Reddy.

Political agitation

Vijayamma went on repeated hunger strikes, protesting various policies such as a power tariff hike and the Government's reluctance to release funds towards fee reimbursement of college students. She  participated in agitations on several occasions fighting on behalf of farmers and women and seeking justice on many an issue including Samaikyandhra agitation with an indefinite fast demanding the Government of India to keep Andhra Pradesh united.

References

External links 

Andhra Pradesh MLAs 2009–2014
Women members of the Andhra Pradesh Legislative Assembly
Living people
People from Kadapa district
YSR Congress Party politicians
1956 births
21st-century Indian women politicians
21st-century Indian politicians
Church of South India
Indian Christians